In chemical separation processes, a mass separating agent (MSA) is a chemical species that is added to ensure that the intended separation process takes place. It is analogous to an energy separating agent, which aids separations processes via addition of energy. An MSA may be partially immiscible with one or more mixture components and frequently is the constituent of highest concentration in the added phase. Alternatively, the MSA may be miscible with a liquid feed mixture, but may selectively alter partitioning of species between liquid and vapor phases.

Disadvantages of using an MSA are a need for an additional separator to recover the MSA for recycle, a need for MSA makeup, possible MSA product contamination, and more difficult design procedures.

Processes like absorption and stripping generally utilize various MSAs.

References

Separation processes